The Avdiivka tram opened August 23, 1965. Due to the ongoing War in Donbass the transport system has not operated since 2015 despite attempts to restart operations (the last such attempt was in 2017).

In 2010 it had 2 routes, 24.0 km and 25 rail cars. It used mainly multiple-unit tram consists, with an average of 3-4 cars per set.

History

The first section of the tram line  opened August 23, 1965. It was opened to connect the city with the Avdiivka Coke Plant. Still in Ukraine no other tram line exists that was built to connect  residential areas with a large industrial enterprise. The first stock used were the KTM/KTP-1 two-axle trams.

In 1969 and 1972 the line was further extended. In the early 1970s it was planned to extend the tram line to Donetsk, works to this end did start, but the project was never finished. In 1977 and 1978 the KTM-5 tram type replaced the KTM/KTP-1 type.

In 1986 the tram line was extended to the village Spartak, almost doubling the length of the line.

In 2003 tram traffic to Spartak was permanently suspended.

Although Avdiivka was already suffering from the War in Donbass in June 2014 trams in Avdiivka continued to operate. After three trams were hit by artillery fire in January 2015 the tram line was completely dismantled. By late March 2015 tram traffic was completely stopped due to artillery bombardments and power failures. In 2016 a part of the tram line was reopened, but in January 2017 the tram line was permanently closed because of active fighting in Avdiivka. Currently the former tram line is served by a shuttle bus with the same number,  "1".

References

External links 

Avdiivka tram on the site "Trams and trolleybuses in the countries of the former Soviet Union» 

Tram transport in Ukraine
Avdiivka
Defunct railroads